Hüyükköy can refer to:

 Hüyükköy, Atkaracalar
 Hüyükköy, Baskil
 Hüyükköy, Orta